Tupinambis palustris, the swamp tegu, is a species of lizard in the family Teiidae. It is endemic to Brazil.

References

Tupinambis
Reptiles described in 2002
Taxa named by Paulo Roberto Manzani
Taxa named by Augusto Shinya Abe